In geometry, the order-3 snub octagonal tiling is a semiregular tiling of the hyperbolic plane. There are four triangles, one octagon on each vertex. It has Schläfli symbol of sr{8,3}.

Images 
Drawn in chiral pairs, with edges missing between black triangles:

Related polyhedra and tilings 
This semiregular tiling is a member of a sequence of snubbed polyhedra and tilings with vertex figure (3.3.3.3.n) and Coxeter–Dynkin diagram . These figures and their duals have (n32) rotational symmetry, being in the Euclidean plane for n=6, and hyperbolic plane for any higher n. The series can be considered to begin with n=2, with one set of faces degenerated into digons.

From a Wythoff construction there are ten hyperbolic uniform tilings that can be based from the regular octagonal tiling. 

Drawing the tiles colored as red on the original faces, yellow at the original vertices, and blue along the original edges, there are 10 forms.

References
 John H. Conway, Heidi Burgiel, Chaim Goodman-Strass, The Symmetries of Things 2008,  (Chapter 19, The Hyperbolic Archimedean Tessellations)

See also 
 Snub hexagonal tiling
 Floret pentagonal tiling
 Order-3 heptagonal tiling
 Tilings of regular polygons
 List of uniform planar tilings
 Kagome lattice

External links 

 Hyperbolic and Spherical Tiling Gallery
 KaleidoTile 3: Educational software to create spherical, planar and hyperbolic tilings
 Hyperbolic Planar Tessellations, Don Hatch

Chiral figures
Hyperbolic tilings
Isogonal tilings
Semiregular tilings
Snub tilings